The 1975 Houston Oilers season was the team's 16th year, and sixth in the National Football League.

In Bum Phillips' first season as Coach the Oilers played competitive football, posting their first winning season in eight years with a 10-4 record. All four losses were to the Pittsburgh Steelers and Cincinnati Bengals, who beat out the Oilers for the Division Title and Wild Card spot, respectively; the Oilers did not make the playoffs for the sixth consecutive season. During week 13, the Oilers defeated the Oakland Raiders, who posted an 11-3 record and advanced to the AFC Championship game. During the season, the Oilers also defeated Washington and Miami, each teams with a winning record.

It was a three-win improvement over their previous season, and the franchise's best record since 1962.

Offseason

NFL draft

Roster

Regular season
The team achieved a winning record with ten wins and four losses, but finished only third in the division and missed the playoffs for the sixth consecutive season.

Schedule

Standings

Awards and records

Milestones
The Houston Oilers were the last NFL team to finally win a game against the NFC, since the AFL/NFL merge happened in 1970.

References

 Oilers on Pro Football Reference
 Oilers on jt-sw.com

Houston Oilers
Houston Oilers seasons
Houston